Ahmed Sidhique is an Indian actor and writer who mainly works in the Malayalam film industry. He debuted in 2009 by penning the screenplay for Uday Ananthan's Mrityunjayam which is the fourth segment in the movie Kerala Cafe. He was noted for the role of K.T.Mirash in the movie Salt N' Pepper. He also played the role of "Musthafa" in the movie Thattathin Marayathu, who is a close aide of the hero. He has written the screenplay for the Aashiq Abu directed movie Gangster starring Mammootty.

Filmography

As an actor

As screenwriter

Short films

References

External links

Twitter Account

Living people
Male actors from Thiruvananthapuram
Screenwriters from Thiruvananthapuram
Indian male film actors
Indian male voice actors
Male actors in Malayalam cinema
21st-century Indian male actors
Malayalam screenwriters
Year of birth missing (living people)